Hanna Instruments is a global manufacturer of analytical instrumentation.  It was founded in 1978 in Padova, Italy by Oscar and Anna Nardo. Hanna Instruments has a network of over 40 subsidiaries in 32 countries around the world. Hanna Instruments is headquartered in Woonsocket, Rhode Island and has manufacturing sites in  Mauritius, Singapore, Hungary and Romania. All production facilities are ISO 9001 Certified.

Hanna Instruments Developments
According to the company's promotional material:

In 1980, Hanna Instruments developed the first single-probe portable conductivity meter. 
In 1984, Hanna Instruments developed the first microprocessor-based handheld pH meter. 
In 1985, Hanna Instruments became the first company to introduce a pH electrode with a built-in temperature sensor 
In 1988, Hanna Instruments became the first company to introduce the pre-amplified pH electrode. 
In 1992, Hanna Instruments became the first company to offer a portable pH meter with plain-paper printing.
In 1997, Hanna Instruments became the first company to offer a pH tester with double junction electrode.
In 2000, Hanna Instruments became the first company to offer a multi-parameter (pH/conductivity/temperature) pocket tester.

References

Brands Under Hanna Instruments
 Backpack Lab 
 Checker HC Handheld colorimeters 

Companies based in Rhode Island